Poświętne may refer to the following places in Poland:
Poświętne, Lower Silesian Voivodeship (south-west Poland)
Poświętne, Sokółka County in Podlaskie Voivodeship (north-east Poland)
Poświętne, Opoczno County in Łódź Voivodeship (central Poland)
Poświętne, Białystok County in Podlaskie Voivodeship (north-east Poland)
Poświętne, Tomaszów Mazowiecki County in Łódź Voivodeship (central Poland)
Poświętne, Maków County in Masovian Voivodeship (east-central Poland)
Poświętne, Radom County in Masovian Voivodeship (east-central Poland)
Poświętne, Wołomin County in Masovian Voivodeship (east-central Poland)
Poświętne, Nowy Tomyśl County in Greater Poland Voivodeship (west-central Poland)
Poświętne, Szamotuły County in Greater Poland Voivodeship (west-central Poland)